Synchronous context-free grammars (SynCFG or SCFG; not to be confused with stochastic CFGs) are a type of formal grammar designed for use in transfer-based machine translation. Rules in these grammars apply to two languages at the same time, capturing grammatical structures that are each other's translations.

The theory of SynCFGs borrows from syntax-directed transduction and syntax-based machine translation, modeling the reordering of clauses that occurs when translating a sentence by correspondences between phrase-structure rules in the source and target languages. Performance of SCFG-based MT systems has been found comparable with, or even better than, state-of-the-art phrase-based machine translation systems.
Several algorithms exist to perform translation using SynCFGs.

Formalism
Rules in a SynCFG are superficially similar to CFG rules, except that they specify the structure of two phrases at the same time; one in the source language (the language being translated) and one in the target language. Numeric indices indicate correspondences between non-terminals in both constituent trees. Chiang gives the Chinese/English example:

  (yu  you , have  with )

Software
 cdec, MT decoding package that supports SynCFGs
 Joshua, a machine translation decoding system written in Java

References

Formal languages
Machine translation
Natural language parsing
Statistical natural language processing